Weber electrodynamics is a historical alternative to Maxwell electrodynamics developed by Wilhelm Eduard Weber. In this theory, Coulomb's Law becomes velocity dependent. Weber electrodynamics does not describe electromagnetic waves and is incompatible with special relativity.

Mathematical description

In the limit that speeds and accelerations are small (i.e. ), this reduces to the usual Coulomb's law.

This can be derived from the potential energy: 

Taking the derivative of the potential, we note that .

In Maxwell's equations, by contrast, the force F on a charge from nearby charges can be calculated by combining Jefimenko's equations with the Lorentz force law. The corresponding potential energy is approximately:

Using these expressions, the regular form of Ampère's law and Faraday's law can be derived. Importantly, Weber electrodynamics does not predict an expression like the Biot–Savart law and testing differences between Ampere's law and the Biot–Savart law is one way to test Weber electrodynamics.

Velocity-dependent potential energy 
In 1848, only two years after the development of his electrodynamics force, Weber presented a velocity-dependent potential energy from which this force might be derived, namely:

This result can be achieved using force because the force can be defined as the negative of the vector gradient of the potential field, that is,

where the constant of integration is neglected because the point where the potential energy is zero is arbitrarily chosen.

By the chain rule, we have that , and because of this, we notice that the whole force can be rewritten as

where the product rule was used. Therefore, the force can be written as

Newton's third law in Maxwell and Weber electrodynamics

In Maxwell electrodynamics, Newton's third law does not hold for particles. Instead, particles exert forces on electromagnetic fields, and fields exert forces on particles, but particles do not directly exert forces on other particles. Therefore, two nearby particles do not always experience equal and opposite forces. Related to this, Maxwell electrodynamics predicts that the laws of conservation of momentum and conservation of angular momentum are valid only if the momentum of particles and the momentum of surrounding electromagnetic fields are taken into account. The total momentum of all particles is not necessarily conserved, because the particles may transfer some of their momentum to electromagnetic fields or vice versa. The well-known phenomenon of radiation pressure proves that electromagnetic waves are indeed able to "push" on matter. See Maxwell stress tensor and Poynting vector for further details.

The Weber force law is quite different: All particles, regardless of size and mass, will exactly follow Newton's third law. Therefore, Weber electrodynamics, unlike Maxwell electrodynamics, has conservation of particle momentum and conservation of particle angular momentum.

Predictions
Weber dynamics has been used to explain various phenomena such as wires exploding when exposed to high currents.

Limitations

Despite various efforts, a velocity-dependent and/or acceleration-dependent correction to Coulomb's law has never been observed, as described in the next section. Moreover, Hermann von Helmholtz observed that Weber electrodynamics predicted that under certain configurations charges can act as if they had negative inertial mass, which has also never been observed. (Some scientists have, however, disputed Helmholtz's argument.)

Experimental tests

Velocity-dependent tests
Velocity- and acceleration-dependent corrections to Maxwell's equations arise in Weber electrodynamics. The strongest limits on a new velocity-dependent term come from evacuating gasses from containers and observing whether the electrons become charged. However, because the electrons used to set these limits are Coulomb bound, renormalization effects may cancel the velocity-dependent corrections. Other searches have spun current-carrying solenoids, observed metals as they cooled, and used superconductors to obtain a large drift velocity.  None of these searches have observed any discrepancy from Coulomb's law. Observing the charge of particle beams provides weaker bounds, but tests the velocity-dependent corrections to Maxwell's equations for particles with higher velocities.

Acceleration-dependent tests
Test charges inside a spherical conducting shell will experience different behaviors depending on the force law the test charge is subject to. By measuring the oscillation frequency of a neon lamp inside a spherical conductor biased to a high voltage, this can be tested. Again, no significant deviations from the Maxwell theory have been observed.

Relation to quantum electrodynamics
Quantum electrodynamics (QED) is perhaps the most stringently tested theory in physics, with highly nontrivial predictions verified to an accuracy better than 10 parts per billion: See precision tests of QED. Since Maxwell's equations can be derived as the classical limit of the equations of QED, it follows that if QED is correct (as is widely believed by mainstream physicists), then Maxwell's equations and the Lorentz force law are correct too.

Although it has been demonstrated that, in certain aspects, the Weber force formula is consistent with Maxwell's equations and the Lorentz force, they are not exactly equivalent—and more specifically, they make various contradictory predictions as described above. Therefore, they cannot both be correct.

References

Further reading 
 André Koch Torres Assis: Weber's electrodynamics. Kluwer Acad. Publ., Dordrecht 1994, .

Electrodynamics